Percevan is a French comic drawn by Philippe Luguy, and written by Jean Léturgie and Xavier Fauche, first pre-published in the French prepublication magazine Gomme ! in 1981. The adventures take place in a medieval world where magic plays an important part. The series is more mature and darker than one might think at first sight in view of the round design of Luguy.

Characters 

 Percevan : The hero. He is a knight who has traces of magic in him since "Shaarlan" entered his body.
 Kervin : A troubadour, a baladin, and Percevan's best friend. Very round, he is permanently famished.
 Guimly : little animal of the simlusnanus species.
 Balkis : Witch, after meeting Percevan she gives up black magic.
 Altaïs : Witch, sister of Balkis.
 Shyloc'h : Repulsive character and Balkis's Servant.
 Sharlaan : Wizard
 Mortepierre : Baron. Power and Wealth are the only things he desires.
 Polémic : Mortepierre's Servant.
 Ciensinfus : Evil wizard.

Title List

Original Titles
Here is the complete list of the original comics as published by Dargaud:

 1. Les Trois Étoiles d'Ingaar (1982)
 2. Le Tombeau des Glaces (1983)
 3. L'Épée de Ganaël (1984) 
 4. Le Pays d'Aslor (1985)
 5. Le Sablier d'El Jerada (1986) 
 6. Les Clefs de Feu (1988)
 7. Les Seigneurs de l'Enfer (1992)
 8. La Table d'Émeraude (1995) 
 9. L'Arcantane Noire (1996) 
 10. Le Maître des Étoiles (1998) 
 11. Les Sceaux de l'Apocalypse (2001) 
 12. Le Septième Sceau (2004)
 13. Les Terres sans Retour (2010) 
 14. Les Marches d'Eliandysse (2011)
 15. Le Huitième Royaume (2013) 
 16. La Couronne du Crépuscule (2016)

English translations
Fantasy Flight has published four volumes in English, each volume collecting three original albums.

Legends of Percevan, Volume 1: The Stars of Ingaar — 2009; 
Legends of Percevan, Volume 2: The Realm of Aslor — 2009; 
Legends of Percevan, Volume 3: The Shadow of Malicorne — 2010; 
Legends of Percevan, Volume 4: The Seven Seals — 2010;

External links
Percevan website (in French)
Tassilo (in German)

Fantasy comics
Action-adventure comics
French comics titles
French fantasy